Federalist No. 6 is a political essay written by Alexander Hamilton, writing under the pseudonym of Publius, just like James Madison and John Jay in the other Federalist Papers. Published on November 14, 1787, this essay argues for the benefits of a union between the American states. Formally titled "Concerning Dangers from Dissensions Between the States", Federalist No. 6 continues to discuss that the States would devolve into conflict with each other. This discussion is a bastion of Federalist thought in their fight against the Anti-Federalists.

Historical Context 
Almost precisely two months before the publication of Federalist No. 6, the Constitutional Convention (or Federal Convention in the vernacular of the day) adjourned and released the document they had drafted out of the public eye. The proposed Constitution was unexpected, as the Convention was for the express purpose of proposing changes to the Articles of Confederation, not designing a new government entirely. As a result, a great controversy arose, as those aligning with the title Federalist like Hamilton, Madison, Jay and others fought those with the title of Anti-Federalist like Jefferson, Adams, Smith, Dewitt, and Mason, about what powers a newly formed Federal Government ought to have. These debates and arguments occurred in informal forums like taverns and in formal forums like state conventions. Also, a marked change in the times was wide publication of the arguments.

Hamilton's Arguments 
Federalist No. 6 notes several republics and 'commercial republics' that experienced almost perpetual states of conflict. These previous republics of old include Sparta, Athens, Rome and Carthage. In mentioning such republics, Hamilton argues that the current arrangement made in the wake of the American Revolution resemble such governments. Hamilton argues that such arrangement would ruin the new country. In recounting the history of such republics that failed, Hamilton argues that commercial ties between separate republics or States is not enough for stability or cooperation and he summarily espouses support for a more extensive Union. Further, he declares that nations who exist as neighbors are natural enemies, and must be brought together by a shared document and shared commercial interests. Hamilton cites Shays Rebellion as an example of the dangerous volatility of the current States under the Articles of Confederation. Hamilton supports the proposed Constitution, to bind the States together.

Counterarguments 
Counterarguments to Hamilton's beliefs come from authors like John Dewitt in his own time. Dewitt, a prominent Anti-Federalist argues directly against the ideas presented in Hamilton's No. 6. In his first Essay, Dewitt criticizes the speed at which some wish the Constitution to be ratified. It is Dewitt's view that the new Constitution will unnaturally bind the States together, in addition to granting the new government powers which Dewitt disagrees with. Dewitt also argues against Hamilton's chosen Constitution as it lacks a Bill of Rights. Additionally, it is Dewitt's view that such a document like the Constitution will be hard to change. Finally, Dewitt strikes out at Hamilton's ideas of a grand Republic that spans the continent and is powerful, instead preferring a content, but more democratic existence with separate states.

Modern Relevance 
Federalist No. 6 maintains some relevance in the Twenty-First Century. Federalist No. 6 maintains this relevance in the eyes of some as it, along with Federalist No. 7, deals with the still pertinent issue of whether or not even partial disunion among the states will lead to ruin or to greater heights. Though the Constitution was and is ratified by all states in the United States, Federalism, or the system of dividing powers in America has undergone changes in the time since 1787. Though the Federalists of the period would disagree, modern authors like Daniel Smith argue that the States, as arranged today, are in a state of disunion, and for the better. Scholars like Smith argue in opposition to Hamilton; arguing that states engaging in municipal or public finance in order to pay for the public goods that many citizens take for granted such as roads, bridges, hospitals, et cetera benefit from the disunion of bond markets, and consequently the states themselves. Such disunion allows states to take into account the differing cultures and financial situations that they may have according to Smith. Such a continuing discussion over how best to administrate the powers of government consistently calls in documents like Federalist No. 6 and Federalist No. 7.

See also 
Federalist No. 7

The Federalist Papers

Federalist No. 10

References

External links 

 Text of The Federalist No. 6: congress.gov

06
Federalist No. 06
1787 in the United States
1787 essays